Bertram Brown may refer to:
Bertram S. Brown (1931–2020), American psychiatrist
Bertram Wyatt-Brown (1932–2012), historian
Bertram Brown (musician), see Earl Zero

See also
Bert Brown (disambiguation)